New Midway is an unincorporated community in Frederick County, Maryland, United States.

References

External links

Unincorporated communities in Frederick County, Maryland
Unincorporated communities in Maryland